Heese is a Germanic surname. It may refer to:

Daniel Heese (1867–1901), German Christian missionary in South Africa
Fred Heese (born 1943), Canadian sprint canoer
Horst Heese (born 1943), German former professional football player and manager
Marié Heese (born 1942), South African novelist and teacher
Mark Heese (born 1969), Canadian beach volleyball player